The Chautauqua Tower is located at Glen Echo Park in Montgomery County, Maryland, US. It is a Richardsonian Romanesque circular structure of irregularly shaped, rough-faced stone, dominating the central entrance to the park. Construction of the tower was started in either 1890 or 1891, it was completed in 1892, and is approximately 34 feet in diameter and three stories high, capped by an 11-sided roof of steep pitch with a flagpole rising from its peak. It is the sole intact physical remnant of the late-19th century Chautauqua movement at Glen Echo, Maryland, and as a local specimen of late-Victorian rustic architecture.

It was listed on the National Register of Historic Places in 1980.

The tower was originally part of a large complex of buildings at the entrance of the Glen Echo Chautauqua. The National Register of Historic Places nomination form correctly identifies the architect, Victor Mindeleff, but misspells his name. Mindeleff is best known for his work with the Bureau of American Ethnology.

Currently, the Tower is the studio of Artist in Residence J. Jordan Bruns and Mariana Kastrinakis. The first floor is also used as studio space by artists on a monthly basis.

Gallery

References

External links

, including photo in 2003, at Maryland Historical Trust website
Glen Echo Park - A History page National Park Service archived page

Buildings and structures on the National Register of Historic Places in Maryland
Towers completed in 1892
Buildings and structures in Montgomery County, Maryland
Richardsonian Romanesque architecture in Maryland
Historic American Buildings Survey in Maryland
Chautauqua
National Register of Historic Places in Montgomery County, Maryland
1892 establishments in Maryland